Heaven & Earth is a 1993 biographical war drama film written and directed by Oliver Stone, and starring Tommy Lee Jones, Haing S. Ngor, Joan Chen, and Hiep Thi Le. It is Stone's third film about the Vietnam War, following Platoon (1986) and Born on the Fourth of July (1989).

The film was based on the books When Heaven and Earth Changed Places and Child of War, Woman of Peace, both authored by Le Ly Hayslip about her experiences during and after the Vietnam War. It received mixed reviews and performed poorly at the box office.

Plot
Le Ly is a girl growing up in a Vietnamese village. Her life changes when communist insurgents show up in the village to defend against the forces of France and then the United States. During the American involvement, Le Ly is captured and tortured by South Vietnamese troops who suspect she is a spy for the North, and later raped by the Viet Cong because they suspect that she is a traitor to the North. After the rape, her relationship with her village is destroyed, and she and her family are forced to move.

Her family moves to Saigon and she is employed by a family there. The master of the household misleads her into believing that he genuinely cares for her, and she falls for him and gets pregnant by him. The master's wife becomes enraged and Le Ly's whole family is forced to move back to their former province. There she meets Steve Butler, a Gunnery Sergeant in the United States Marine Corps. When she first meets him she is not interested in a boyfriend or marriage, having been through so much suffering. Steve falls for Le Ly and treats her very well, making a big difference in her life while in Vietnam.

The two leave Vietnam and move to San Diego. Their life together begins well, but years of killing in the war have taken their toll on Steve, who becomes uncontrollably violent. The relationship falters, despite Le Ly's attempts to reconcile with Steve. After an impassioned plea by Le Ly for Steve to come back to her, he commits suicide. Many years following this tragic experience, Le Ly returns to Vietnam with her sons. She briefly reunites with her eldest's father who she introduces his son to, and he tearfully embraces his son. She then takes her sons to her former village to meet her family and shows them where she came from.

Cast
 Tommy Lee Jones as Steve Butler
 Joan Chen as Mama
 Haing S. Ngor as Papa
 Hiep Thi Le as Le Ly
 Thuan K. Nguyen as Uncle Luc
 Dustin Nguyen as Sau
 Vinh Dang as Bon
 Mai Le Ho as Hai
 Dale Dye as Larry
 Debbie Reynolds as Eugenia
 Conchata Ferrell as Bernice
 Michael Paul Chan as Interrogator
 Robert John Burke as G.I. Paul
 Tim Guinee as Young Sergeant (as Timothy Guinee)
 Timothy Carhart as Big Mike
 Annie McEnroe as Dinner Guest #1
 Marianne Muellerleile as Dinner Guest #2
 Marshall Bell as Dinner Guest #3
 Jeffrey Jones as Minister (uncredited)
 Donal Logue as Red (uncredited)

Release

Theatrical release
Heaven & Earth opened in 63 theaters on December 25, 1993. Its widespread release date was January 7, 1994, at which date it was playing in 781 theaters.

Reception
The film received mixed reviews, in contrast to Stone's other films and especially films like Platoon and JFK. The review aggregator website Rotten Tomatoes reported that 43% of critics gave the film a positive review based on a sample of 21 reviews, with an average score of 5.2/10. The site's consensus states: "Heaven & Earth is a well-intentioned glimpse into an underrepresented perspective on Vietnam, but Oliver Stone's solemn storytelling keeps audiences at a fatal distance from Hiep Thi Le's enigmatic heroine." Desson Howe of The Washington Post called the script "structurally clunky" and complained that the film "lacks a poetic center." James Berardinelli noted that the film "lacks much of the narrative strength" of Stone's other Vietnam films, particularly once Jones's character appears. Berardinelli also complained that flashbacks and voiceovers are overdone, although he did praise Stone for "a number of memorable camera shots."

Handpicked by Stone, actress Hiep Thi Le's performance received mixed reviews. Roger Ebert called her performance "extraordinary", and Desson Howe complimented her "authentic presence." James Berardinelli, however, called her "adequate, but not peerless" and noted that the emotional scenes reveal "the limits of her acting ability."

Box office
Heaven & Earth opened in 63 theaters and, for its opening weekend, earned $379,807. For its widespread release, it played in 781 theaters and, for the weekend, earned $1,703,179. The film has had gross domestic receipts of $5,864,949.  It was a box office failure earning only $5.9 million on a budget of $33 million.

Music

The music, by composer Kitarō, won the 1993 Golden Globe Award for Best Original Score.

See also

 List of media set in San Diego

References

External links
 
 
 

1993 films
1993 drama films
1990s war drama films
1990s English-language films
Vietnamese-language films
English-language French films
French war drama films
American war drama films
Biographical films about writers
Films about interracial romance
Films about the United States Marine Corps
Films based on multiple works
Films directed by Oliver Stone
Films shot in Vietnam
Films set in Saigon
Films set in Thailand
Films with screenplays by Oliver Stone
Regency Enterprises films
StudioCanal films
Vietnam War films
Films about Vietnamese Americans
Warner Bros. films
Films about immigration to the United States
Asian-American drama films
Films produced by Arnon Milchan
1990s American films
1990s French films
1993 multilingual films
French multilingual films
American multilingual films
Films set in San Diego